Stensele is a locality situated in Storuman Municipality, Västerbotten County, Sweden with 546 inhabitants in 2010. It lies not far from the municipal seat of Storuman itself. The town boasts Sweden's largest wooden church.

Climate

References

See also
 Blue Highway, a tourist route (Norway - Sweden - Finland - Russia)

Populated places in Västerbotten County
Populated places in Storuman Municipality